This is a list of Qatari football transfers for the 2012 summer transfer window by club. Only transfers of clubs in the Qatar Stars League are included.

Players without a club may join one at any time, either during or in between transfer windows.

Qatar Stars League

Al-Arabi

In:

Out:

Al-Gharafa

In:

Out:

Al Kharaitiyat

In:

Out:

Al-Khor

In:

Out:

Al Rayyan

In:

Out:

Al Sadd

In:

Out:

Al Sailiya

In:

}

Out:

Al-Wakrah

In:

Out:

El Jaish

In:

Out:

Lekhwiya

In:

Out:

}

}

Qatar SC

In:

Out:

Umm Salal

In:

Out:

References

Qatari
2012–13 in Qatari football
Lists of Qatari football transfers